Christopher John Birch (born 1984) is a Welsh business consultant who reportedly underwent personality changes and a change in sexual orientation following a stroke in 2005 when he was 20.

Birch has given TV interviews about his stroke on The Saturday Night Show, Doctors and Filip and Fredrik in 2011, as well as A Totally Different Me and Sunday Night in 2012.

Totally Different Me is a BBC documentary about Birch's life before and after the accident and how he began to cope with his new life. The documentary aired in April 2012. Vice also published a follow-up interview with Birch in 2017 in which he criticised how the media had portrayed his experience.

References

External links
Chris Birch Website

1980s births
Living people
British hairdressers
Welsh LGBT sportspeople
Gay sportsmen
21st-century Welsh businesspeople
People from Caerphilly
21st-century Welsh LGBT people